Bishop Donahue Memorial High School was a private, Roman Catholic high school in McMechen, West Virginia. It was part of the Roman Catholic Diocese of Wheeling-Charleston.  It was named after Bishop Patrick James Donahue (1849–1922), who served as the third Bishop of the Diocese of Wheeling from 1894 until his death in 1922.

At the end of the 2016-2017 school year, Bishop Donahue High School closed.  It was opened for 62 school years (1955 - 2017) and graduated 59 classes (1959 - 2017).

Background 
Bishop Donahue High School was opened in September 1955.  It graduated its first class in 1959.  It was founded because of the need for a central high school to serve the Roman Catholics of Marshall County so that they would not have to travel great distances in order to obtain a Roman Catholic education beyond elementary school.  Prior to its founding, the only other Roman Catholic high schools in the Upper Ohio Valley in the state of West Virginia were Wheeling Central Catholic High School in Ohio County and Weirton Madonna High School in Hancock County.

Supporting Parishes

The parishes located in Marshall County, West Virginia that supported Bishop Donahue High School both financially and spiritually were Saint John in Benwood (established 1875), Saint James in McMechen (established 1900), Saint Francis Xavier in Moundsville (established 1857), Saint Jude in Glen Dale (established 1968) and Our Lady of Peace in Mount Olivet (established 1962).

Feeder Schools

At its inception in 1955, Bishop Donahue High School's feeder schools were Saint John School in Benwood, Saint Catherine School in Benwood (served by Saint John Parish), Saint James School in McMechen and Saint Francis Xavier School in Moundsville.  Saint Catherine School closed in 1962 at the end of the 1961-1962 school year.  In 1962, Our Lady of Peace Parish was founded in Mount Olivet in Marshall County, and its parish school became a feeder school of Bishop Donahue.  In 1971, Saint John School in Benwood and Saint James School in McMechen were consolidated, thus becoming Saint James and Saint John School, which was located in Benwood.  Saint Francis Xavier School in Moundsville closed in 2012.  Saint James and Saint John School in Benwood closed in 2015.  It was reestablished as All Saints School in the former Saint Francis Xavier school building in Moundsville for the 2015-2016 school year, but closed at the end of the 2016-2017 school year.

External links 
 School Website

Notes and references 

Roman Catholic Diocese of Wheeling-Charleston
Catholic secondary schools in West Virginia
Education in Marshall County, West Virginia
Educational institutions established in 1955
Marist Brothers schools
Buildings and structures in Marshall County, West Virginia
1955 establishments in West Virginia
2017 disestablishments in West Virginia